The 2019 BWF World Tour Finals (officially known as the HSBC BWF World Tour Finals 2019 for sponsorship reasons) was the final tournament of the 2019 BWF World Tour. It was held from 11 to 15 December 2019 in Guangzhou, China and had a total prize of $1,500,000.

Tournament 
The 2019 BWF World Tour Finals was the second edition of the BWF World Tour Finals and was organized by the Guangzhou Sports Bureau, Guangzhou Sports Competitions Centre, Guangzhou Badminton Administrative Centre, and Guangzhou Badminton Association. It was hosted by the Chinese Badminton Association and Guangzhou Municipal Government with sanction from the BWF.

Venue 
This international tournament was held at the Tianhe Gymnasium in Tianhe, Guangzhou, China.

Point distribution 
Below is the point distribution for each phase of the tournament based on the BWF points system for the BWF World Tour Finals event.

Prize money 
The total prize money for this tournament was US$1,500,000. Distribution of prize money was in accordance with BWF regulations.

Representatives

Eligible players 
Below are the eligible players for World Tour Finals. Final ranking used was released on 26 November 2019, and not counting the results from the Syed Modi International. Players who won titles at the 2019 BWF World Championships are marked in bold.

Men's singles

Women's singles

Men's doubles

Women's doubles

Mixed doubles

Representatives by nation 

§: Yuta Watanabe from Japan was the only player who played in two categories (men's doubles and mixed doubles).

Performances by nation

Men's singles

Group A

Group B

Finals

Women's singles

Group A

Group B

Finals

Men's doubles

Group A

Group B

Finals

Women's doubles

Group A

Group B

Finals

Mixed doubles

Group A

Group B

Finals

Reference

External links 
 HSBC BWF World Tour Finals website
 Tournament Link
 HSBC BWF World Tour website

BWF World Tour
BWF World Tour Finals
International sports competitions hosted by China
2019 in Chinese sport
Sports competitions in Guangzhou
BWF World Tour Finals
Badminton tournaments in China